Hozelec is a village and municipality in Poprad District in the Prešov Region of northern Slovakia.

Geography
The municipality lies at an altitude of 695 metres and covers an area of 4.011 km². It has a population of about 830 people.

History
In historical records the village was first mentioned in 1248.

Economy and infrastructure
Hozelec is a typical touristic village in High Tatras with good touristic infrastructure. In the village is Children amusement park FunVille.

See also
 List of municipalities and towns in Slovakia

References

Genealogical resources

The records for genealogical research are available at the state archive "Statny Archiv in Levoca, Slovakia"

 Roman Catholic church records (births/marriages/deaths): 1731-1896 (parish B)
 Lutheran church records (births/marriages/deaths): 1710-1910 (parish B)

External links
http://www.funville.sk/ FunVille homepage
Surnames of living people in Hozelec

Villages and municipalities in Poprad District